The 2020 Tour de Hongrie was the 41st edition of the Tour de Hongrie. It was originally scheduled to take place between 13 and 17 May 2020, but was postponed to between 29 August and 2 September 2020 due to the COVID-19 pandemic. It was the sixth edition of the race since its revival in 2015, and was rated as a 2.1 event as part of the 2020 UCI Europe Tour.

Teams
Twenty teams, consisting of five UCI WorldTeams, eight UCI ProTeams, six UCI Continental teams, and the Hungarian national team, participated in the race.

UCI WorldTeams

 
 
 
 
 

UCI ProTeams

 
 
 
 
 
 
 
 

UCI Continental Teams

 
 
 
 
 
 

National Teams

 Hungary

Route

Stages

Stage 1
29 August 2020 — Esztergom to Esztergom,

Stage 2
30 August 2020 — Debrecen to Hajdúszoboszló,

Stage 3
31 August 2020 — Karcag to Nyíregyháza,

Stage 4
1 September 2020 — Sárospatak to Kazincbarcika,

Stage 5
2 September 2020 — Miskolc to Gyöngyös (Kékestető),

Classification leadership table
In the 2020 Tour de Hongrie, four jerseys were awarded. The general classification was calculated by adding each cyclist's finishing times on each stage. The leader of the general classification received a yellow jersey, sponsored by the Hungarian Tourism Agency (Aktív Magyarország), and the winner of this classification is considered the winner of the race.

The second classification was the points classification. Riders were awarded points for finishing in the top fifteen in a stage. Points were also on offer at intermediate sprints. The leader of the points classification wore a green jersey, sponsored by Škoda and Europcar.

There was also a mountains classification for which points were awarded for reaching the top of a climb before other riders. The climbs were categorized, in order of increasing difficulty, as third, second and first-category. The leader of the mountains classification wore a red jersey, sponsored by Cofidis.

The fourth jersey was a classification for Hungarian riders, marked by a white jersey sponsored by the Hungarian Public Road Company (Magyar Közút) and the Hungarian Cycling Federation (Bringasport). Only Hungarian riders were eligible and they were ranked according to their placement in the general classification of the race.

The final classification was the team classification, for which the times of the best three cyclists in each team on each stage was added together; the leading team at the end of the race was the team with the lowest cumulative time.

Final classification standings

General classification

Points classification

Mountains classification

Hungarian rider classification

Teams classification

See also

 2020 in men's road cycling
 2020 in sports

References

Sources

External links

2020
Tour de Hongrie
Tour de Hongrie
Tour de Hongrie
Tour de Hongrie
Tour de Hongrie